Calcium/calmodulin-dependent 3',5'-cyclic nucleotide phosphodiesterase 1C is an enzyme that in humans is encoded by the PDE1C gene.

References

Further reading